, who goes by her mononymous stage name , is a Japanese voice actress and singer affiliated with Sigma Seven. Her major roles include Azuki in Azuki-chan, Yuri Tanima in Wedding Peach, Meiling Li in Cardcaptor Sakura, Tessa in Full Metal Panic, Honoka Yukishiro (Cure White) in Futari wa Pretty Cure, Ulrike in Kyo Kara Maoh!, Yumiko Tomi in Fafner in the Azure, C.C. in Code Geass, Cecilia Alcott in Infinite Stratos, Kale in Dragon Ball Super and Kanna in Inuyasha. In tokusatsu, she voices Mezool in Kamen Rider OOO. In video games, she is the voice of Asahi Takashima in Money Idol Exchanger, Tear Grants in Tales of the Abyss, Ai Nanasaki in Amagami SS, Niyon in Granblue Fantasy and Dusk (Xi) in Arknights.

Biography
During her childhood, Yukana was an ill girl who wasn’t expected to live past the age of 20. As she had hoped to leave a mark for her existence, Yukana chose a career in show business and eventually becoming a voice actress. One of her earliest roles as the title character of Azuki-chan left a big impression as she portrayed an elementary school character despite being a student herself at the time of the show's recording.

 Filmography 
Animation

 Tokusatsu 

 Films 

 Drama CD 

 Video games 

 Discography 

 Singles 
 all or nothing (27 November 1998)
 命咲く (29 October 2008)
 春の雪 (25 May 2012)

 Albums 
 yu ka na (23 December 1998)
 Blooming Voices (29 October 2008)
 Kaze Tsumugi no Aria (風紡ぎのアリア) From the album Brilliant World'' Tales of The Abyss Image Song

References

External links 
  
 
 
 Yukana at GamePlaza-Haruka Voice Acting Database 

1975 births
Living people
People from Futtsu
Voice actresses from Chiba Prefecture
Japanese video game actresses
Japanese voice actresses
Musicians from Chiba Prefecture
20th-century Japanese actresses
21st-century Japanese actresses
21st-century Japanese women singers
21st-century Japanese singers
Sigma Seven voice actors